Bad Oldesloe is a town located in the northern German state of Schleswig-Holstein. It is the capital of the district of Stormarn.

The area has been inhabited since Mesolithic times. The flint tools found here from that era (6000–4500 BC) are clearly defined and known as the Oldesloer Stufe. For a number of years in the 18th century the Moravian Church had a congregation in Bad Oldesloe. It was called "Pilgerruh", i.e. "Pilgrims' Rest". It was given up because of difficulties with the Danish Church authorities. At that time, the Duchy of Holstein was ruled by the kings of Denmark within the Holy Roman Empire.

On 24 April 1945 the town was heavily bombed by Allied forces in the final days of the Second World War in Germany. Threehundred buildings were destroyed, and 706 people were killed as a result of the operation.

Buildings
16th century Mennokate: Memorial for Menno Simons, founder and eponym of the Mennonites, a group of anabaptists. He had some of his works printed in this building.

Transport
Bad Oldesloe station is located on the Lübeck–Hamburg and the Neumünster–Bad Oldesloe railways.

Notable people
 Hermann Olshausen (1796–1839), theologian
 Otto Wilhelm Sonder (1812–1881), botanist and pharmacist 
 Theodor Mommsen (1817–1903), classical scholar, historian, jurist, journalist, politician, archaeologist, writer, and classicist
 August Mommsen (1821–1913), historian
 Klaus Bargsten (1911–2000), captain and sole survivor of sunken U-521 
 Henning Schwarz (1928–1993), CDU politician 
 Isa Genzken (born 1948), sculptress and contemporary artist 
 Rüdiger Schmidt-Grépály (born 1952), Cultural Manager at the Klassik Stiftung Weimar
 Axel Hager (born 1969), beach volleyball player; won bronze medal at the 2000 Sydney Olympics (grew up in Bad Oldesloe)
 Katharina Fegebank (born 1977), politician (The Greens)
 Rouwen Hennings (born 1987), football player
 Julia Görges (born 1988), tennis player
 Maximilian Ahlschwede (born 1990), football player
 Dan-Patrick Poggenberg (born 1992), football player
 Wincent Weiss (born 1993), singer and model
 Dren Feka (born 1997), professional footballer

Twin towns – sister cities

Bad Oldesloe is twinned with:
 Be'er Ya'akov, Israel
 Jifna, Palestine
 Kołobrzeg, Poland
 Olivet, France

References

External links

 www.badoldesloe.de

Towns in Schleswig-Holstein
Stormarn (district)
Spa towns in Germany